William Faber may refer to: 

William F. Faber (politician) (1858–1951), American building contractor and politician in Wisconsin
William F. Faber (bishop) (1860–1934), American clergyman

See also
Frederick William Faber (1814–1863), English hymn writer and theologian